Global Campaign for Education is an international coalition of non-governmental organizations, working to promote children's and adult education through research and advocacy. It was formed in 1999 as a partnership between NGOs that were separately active in the area, including ActionAid, Oxfam, Education International, Global March Against Child Labour and national networks in around 80 countries including Bangladesh and Brazil.

References

External links
 Global Campaign for Education, Official website

International educational organizations
Organizations established in 1999